Regimental Sergeant Major of the Army (RSM-A) is the most senior Warrant Officer in the Australian Army. It is a singular appointment – it is only held by one person at any time. RSM-A holds the unique rank of Warrant Officer (WO) which is senior to Warrant Officer Class One. The special insignia for the RSM-A is the Australian coat of arms with a wreath around it. The twelfth and current Regimental Sergeant Major of the Army is Kim Felmingham.

Based on the United States Army practice of appointing a Sergeant Major of the Army, the RSM-A is responsible to the Chief of Army (CA).

The appointment is the equivalent of the Warrant Officer of the Navy (WO-N) in the Royal Australian Navy, and the Warrant Officer of the Air Force (WOFF-AF) in the Royal Australian Air Force.

The post was created by the then Chief of Army, Lieutenant General Sir Phillip Bennett.

Appointees

See also
 Sergeant Major of the Army
 Army Sergeant Major
 Sergeant Major of the Army (Denmark)
 Sergeant Major of the Army (South Africa)

References

Australian Army
Military appointments of Australia